The 2022 Bush's Beans 200 was the 18th stock car race of the 2022 ARCA Menards Series season, the 8th and final race of the 2022 ARCA Menards Series East, the 10th and final race of the 2022 Sioux Chief Showdown and the 2nd iteration of the event. The race was held on Thursday, September 15, 2022, in Bristol, Tennessee at Bristol Motor Speedway, a 0.533 mile (0.858 km) permanent oval shaped racetrack. The race took the scheduled 200 laps to complete. Sammy Smith, driving for Kyle Busch Motorsports, dominated the entire race, leading 189 laps for his fourth career ARCA Menards Series win, and his eighth career ARCA Menards Series East win, and his ninth win overall this season. To fill out the podium, Brandon Jones, driving for Joe Gibbs Racing, and Taylor Gray, driving for David Gilliland Racing, finished 2nd and 3rd, respectively.

After Taylor Gray spun during the middle of the race, Smith would claim the 2022 ARCA Menards Series East championship, along with the 2022 Sioux Chief Showdown championship. Although Gray ended up finishing in the third spot, he was too many points behind Smith to claim the title.

Background 
Bristol Motor Speedway, formerly known as Bristol International Raceway and Bristol Raceway, is a NASCAR short track venue located in Bristol, Tennessee. Constructed in 1960, it held its first NASCAR race on July 30, 1961. Bristol is among the most popular tracks on the NASCAR schedule because of its distinct features, which include extraordinarily steep banking, an all-concrete surface, two pit roads, and stadium-like seating. It has also been named one of the loudest NASCAR tracks. The track is billed as the "World's Fastest Half-Mile", even though that designation technically belongs to the Volusia Speedway Park dirt track.

Entry list 

 (R) denotes rookie driver

Practice 
The only 50-minute practice session was held on Thursday, September 15, at 2:30 PM EST.

Qualifying 
Qualifying was held on Thursday, September 15, at 3:30 PM EST. The qualifying system used is a multiple-car, multiple-lap system with only one round. Whoever sets the fastest time in the round wins the pole.

Race results

Standings after the race 

Drivers' Championship standings

Note: Only the first 10 positions are included for the driver standings.

References

External links 

2022 ARCA Menards Series
2022 ARCA Menards Series East
NASCAR races at Bristol Motor Speedway
Bush's Beans 200
2022 in sports in Tennessee